Benjamin Tingley Rogers (October 21, 1865June 17, 1918) was an American businessman who was the founder of British Columbia Sugar in Vancouver, British Columbia, Canada.

Early years
Benjamin Tingley Rogers was born in Philadelphia, Pennsylvania, in the USA. His father, Samuel Blythe Rogers was the head of a sugar refinery in Philadelphia. His mother was Clara Augusta Dupuy. Rogers was their second son. In 1869 Benjamin’s father, together with his brother-in-law, Senator Henry Sanford, purchased a sugar plantation in Louisiana. He also built a sugar refinery in New Orleans. Benjamin was a student at the elite Phillips Academy in Andover, Massachusetts. After graduation he attended a course at the Standard Refinery Company in Boston to learn sugar chemistry.

Benjamin’s father died in 1883, prompting his family to move to Brooklyn in New York City from New Orleans. Rogers joined the Havemeyers and Elder refinery, considered at the time the most modern sugar plant in the United States. After staying with the company for four years Rogers had mastered the difficult process of sugar boiling.

Goes to Montreal
In 1889 Rogers was able to bring his dream of starting his own business into reality. While he was in Montreal installing a new filtering system at the Drummond Canada Sugar Refinery owned by George Alexander Drummond, he heard about the opportunities available in western Canada, specifically in Vancouver. Vancouver was the last stop of the Canadian Pacific Railway on the west coast, and Rogers believed the city could be a center of development in Western Canada with an as yet untapped market for processed sugar.

Beginning of the British Columbia Sugar Refining Company
Rogers’ idea to open a sugar refinery in Vancouver met with overwhelming support. Businessmen in New York, encouraged by the Havemeyers, bought shares in Rogers’ nascent company. Their reputations also lent important legitimacy to the venture. Sugar barrel manufacturer Lowell M. Palmer arranged for Rogers to meet William Cornelius Van Horne, who was the president of the Canadian Pacific Railway. Van Horne was happy to do whatever it took to encourage development at the western terminus of his railway line, so he strongly supported Rogers’ plan. Along with several of his fellow directors of the CPR, including Richard Bladworth Angus, Sir Donald Alexander Smith, Edmund Boyd Osler, and Wilmot Deloui Matthews, Van Horne purchased shares in Rogers’ sugar refinery, which became known as the British Columbia Sugar Refining Company.

The BC Sugar refinery
Rogers opened the BC refinery in 1890, only four years after the founding of the City of Vancouver. In letter written by Rogers to Vancouver Mayor David Oppenheimer and the city council, dated January 27, 1890, Rogers proposes to build a sugar refinery “constructed of brick in the most substantial manner” in just eight months. Rogers requested from the city council a grant of $40,000 and rights to water for 15 years, at no charge. The council agreed all of Rogers’ requests, including the payment of $15,525 for the site of the refinery, but they offered him a grant of only $30,000. Also stipulated in the agreement was the requirement by the city that Rogers not hire any Chinese workers. Since the Asian workers were paid less than the white workers, the city believed businesses would show preferential hiring to the Chinese, thus defeating some of the purpose of bringing the business into the city. A hidden poster uncovered from within the walls of the building, dating to 1895 stated "Chinese Industry, Coolie Labor or Home Industry, White Labour," it read. "Use only sugars refined in our own country." The illustration on the poster was of a Chinese worker lifting sugar for 10 cents a day, and a white worker pushing a wheelbarrow hauling barrels of sugar labeled BC Sugar working for two dollars per day. Rogers agreed not to hire Chinese labor. Raw sugar was imported over sea from Australia, Asia and Central America.

Success
BC Sugar was highly successful. Rogers became a wealthy man from the enterprise, building two mansions which are landmarks today; Gabriola on Davie Street, and Shannon on Granville.

Personal life
On June 1, 1892 Rogers married Mary Isabella Angus in Victoria, British Columbia. Angus was born in 1869 and married Rogers after migrating from England to Canada in July, 1885 with her parents. The couple had four sons, who all succeeded Benjamin as presidents of the company after his death. One grandson also was president.

References

1865 births
1918 deaths
19th-century American businesspeople
American food company founders